"Heartless" is a song written and recorded by the rock band Heart in 1976 for their album Magazine.  Issues with the band's previous record label Mushroom caused a delay in the album's release and "Heartless" was released as a single two years later, after the re-issue of their first single "Crazy on You".

The song is an aggressive hard rock number that opens with a slower synthesizer based interlude before opening up into a full hard rock tune.  The lyrics involve a scorned lover who apparently can't get away from the grasp of her heartless partner. "The doctor said come back again next week / I think that you need me / All she did was cry / She wanted to die doctor when can you see me / There's a guy out there / Seems like he's everywhere / It just ain't fair."

"Heartless" and "Without You" were the only singles released from Magazine, with "Heartless" peaking at number twenty-four on the US Billboard Hot 100.  Cash Box particularly praised the vocals and bass guitar playing.  Record World called it "straight-ahead, rather funky rock, with Ann Wilson's vocal the centerpiece."  Only five months passed before Heart released their next album, Dog and Butterfly.

Chart performance

Weekly charts

Year-end charts

References

1977 songs
1978 singles
Heart (band) songs
Songs written by Nancy Wilson (rock musician)
Songs written by Ann Wilson
Mushroom Records singles
Song recordings produced by Mike Flicker